The Myna Mahila Foundation (MMF) is an Indian organization which empowers women by encouraging discussion of taboo subjects such as menstruation, and by setting up workshops to produce low-cost sanitary protection to enable girls to stay in school. It was founded by Suhani Jalota in 2015 while she was studying at Duke University. 

The foundation's name comes from the Myna bird, famously talkative, and the word "Mahila" for "Woman".

In 2016 Glamour magazine listed the foundation's founder Jalota as one of its "College Women of the Year".

It was one of the seven organisations nominated by Prince Harry and Meghan Markle to receive donations in lieu of wedding presents when the couple married on 19 May 2018. In 2017 Markle wrote an article about the foundation for Time magazine, with the title "How Periods Affect Potential", after a trip to Delhi and Mumbai with World Vision where she met and shadowed women involved. The same year Markle included the foundation's founder Jalota in a list of "The Ten Women Who Changed My Life" in Glamour magazine.

Purpose
Apart from encouraging conversations around taboo subjects such as menstruation, the foundation provides stable employment to women dwelling in slums by encouraging them to manufacture low cost sanitary napkins that they can sell back into their communities at a fraction of the cost, thus improving menstrual hygiene of the communities too and empowering the women.

Current Work
With about 3000 customers, the foundation employs about 35 women, 15 of whom work as manufacturers and the other 20 work as saleswomen for the product. They expect to reach 10000 customers by the end of 2018. It also empowers its staff by training them in women's health, English, Math, and life skills such as self-defence.  On the support received via the royal wedding, founder Jalota said that it would further help them expand their reach into the urban slums in Mumbai.

References

External links

Foundations based in India
Women's organisations based in India
Menstrual cycle
Organizations established in 2015
2015 establishments in Maharashtra